Nils Elias Børresen (1812–1863) was a Norwegian politician.

He was elected to the Parliament of Norway in 1848, 1851, 1854, 1857, 1859 and 1862, representing the constituency of Flekkefjord. He worked as a merchant in that city. He was mayor of Flekkefjord in 1846, 1849, 1850, 1852 and 1862.

References

1812 births
1863 deaths
Norwegian businesspeople
Members of the Storting
Mayors of places in Vest-Agder
People from Flekkefjord